The Cleveland Air Operations Unit (CAOU) was the air support/operations unit for the Cleveland Police force. It has since been replaced with the national asset to police: National Police Air Service (NPAS)

History 

Between 1995 and 2009 Cleveland Police was a member of the North East Air Support Unit which was a consortium with Durham and Northumbria police forces. The agreement fell apart over funding and location issues so Cleveland Police bought their own helicopter with funds coming from the Cleveland Police Authority and the government.

The Cleveland Air Operations Unit was officially declared operational on 1 April 2009. The helicopter was based at Durham Tees Valley Airport.

In 2010, the chief constables of all of England and Wales' police forces agreed to pool resources and create the National Police Air Service. Under this framework, it was announced that bases and helicopters would be shared across force boundaries with a model to reduce from 31 bases down to 22. In February 2015, it was announced that this reduction would cut further with a move towards 15 national locations with the Cleveland Police helicopter becoming surplus to requirements in the 2016/2017 financial year.

Fleet 

The Cleveland Air Operations Unit had one helicopter. 
2009–2010 Eurocopter EC135T1, registration G-NESV. 2010–2012 Eurocopter EC135P2, registration G-CPAS. It was based at Teesside International Airport. Its police call sign was "India 55".

Use 
The helicopter supported numerous areas of operational policing such as providing video footage, which was vital in directing officers and other emergency services during major incidents. This technology also enabled the police to capture evidence effectively. The aircraft was equipped with thermal imaging cameras for locating criminals and missing people.

The helicopter was also called on to transport people with life-threatening injuries to hospital, when the Great North Air Ambulance was unavailable.

The helicopter unit appeared on Channel 5's Interceptor programme alongside their ground-based colleagues. The last section of filming took place over the end of 2015 and into the start of 2016.

See also 
 Police aviation
 Police aviation in the United Kingdom

References

External links 
Cleveland Police

Police aviation units of the United Kingdom
Defunct organisations based in the United Kingdom
2009 establishments in England